Miss Hong Kong Pageant 2016 was held together with Mr Hong Kong 2016 in TVB City on 11 September 2016. Ten delegates will competed for the Miss Hong Kong title. 

Miss Hong Kong 2015 Louisa Mak crowned her successor Crystal Fung.

Results

Placements

Special Awards
Miss Photogenic: Tiffany Lau
Miss Friendship: Bowie Cheung 張寶兒

Delegates
The Miss Hong Kong 2016 delegates were:

Elimination chart
The rules changed for this year as a knockout competition was used to determine the finalists.

Champion
1st runner-up
2nd runner-up
Advance
Eliminated

Judges
Main Judging Panel:
Miss Photogenic judging panel: 
Andy Hui (許志安), Gigi Leung (梁詠琪), Ruco Chan (陳展鵬), Nancy Wu (胡定欣)

Post-Pageant Notes
 Crystal Fung placed as 2nd runner-up in Miss Chinese International Pageant 2017 in Pahang, Malaysia.

References

Miss Hong Kong Pageants
2016 in Hong Kong
Hong Kong